A by-thirds 2015 Castle Point Borough Council election took place on 7 May 2015 to elect 14 of the 41 members of the Castle Point Borough Council in England. It was part of the English local elections which coincided with the 2015 general election. The result produced a Conservative-affiliated councillor gain, resulting in a Conservative majority of two councillors.

Results

Summary

Ward by ward

References

2015 English local elections
May 2015 events in the United Kingdom
2015
2010s in Essex